The Bussento is a river in southwestern Italy. Originating from Cervati mountain, it flows in the Campanian territory of Cilento, in the Province of Salerno. Its mouth is by the Tyrrhenian Sea, nearby Policastro Bussentino.

Geography
After its origin in Cervati, it flows south of Sanza, crosses Sant'Eliano, nearby the artificial Lake Sabetta (fed by the river), and Caselle in Pittari. After Caselle, it flows under the Pannello mountain, and emerges in Morigerati, next to its municipal borders with Tortorella. After it, the Bussento marks Morigerati's border with Santa Marina, flows south of Sicilì, crosses the municipal borders of Torre Orsaia until its railway station in Calleo and, after, it flows near the localities of Hangar, Santa Lucia and Crocefisso. Its mouth, on the Gulf of Policastro, by the Tyrrhenian Sea, is 700 m west of Policastro Bussentino, near Torre Oliva, and 2.4 km east of Scario.

The main tributary of Bussento is the Bussentino, a creek that flows through Casaletto Spartano, Battaglia, Tortorella, and joins the river in Morigerati, near the Bussento Caves.

Natural environment
The Caves of Bussento, located in Morigerati, are a WWF Oasis. It is a nature reserve that includes gorges and caves along the river.

Gallery

References

External links

Rivers of the Province of Salerno
Cilento
Subterranean rivers
Rivers of Italy
Drainage basins of the Tyrrhenian Sea